Archibald Little (January 12, 1837April 14, 1922) was an Ontario merchant and political figure. He represented Norfolk North in the Legislative Assembly of Ontario as a Liberal member from 1903 to 1904.

He was born in Mayfield, Chinguacousy Township, Peel County, Upper Canada, the son of William Little. In 1868, he married Louisa McCool. He was a merchant in Waterford and chairman of the High School board. He died in Vancouver, British Columbia in 1922.

References

External links 

1837 births
1922 deaths
Ontario Liberal Party MPPs